Maru is a 1971 novel by Bessie Head, exploring racism and ethnic conflict, specifically that of the Tswana and San peoples. It centres on an orphaned Masarwa girl who comes to the community of Dilepe to teach.

References

20th-century South African novels
1971 novels